Henry Walker may refer to:
Henry Walker (basketball) (born 1987), American basketball player previously known as Bill Walker
Henry Walker (cricketer) (1807–1872), English cricketer
Henry Harrison Walker (1832–1912), Confederate States Army brigadier general during the American Civil War
Sir Henry Walker (mines inspector) (1873–1954), English Chief Inspector of Mines
Henry Oliver Walker (1843–1929), American artist
Henry Joseph Walker (1849–1918), Canadian politician and merchant
Henry Alexander Walker (1874–1953), British Army officer
Henry Walker (rugby union), English rugby union player

See also
Harry Walker (disambiguation)